Water Sign is the third album by keyboardist Jeff Lorber as leader of his band "The Jeff Lorber Fusion". Released in 1979, this was Lorber's first album on  Arista Records.

The backing track for the song "Rain Dance" has been sampled most notably for the 1997 Lil' Kim song "Crush on You", but also for the 1996 Tha Dogg Pound holiday song "I Wish," the 1997 SWV song "Love Like This", the 2013 Ariana Grande song "Right There" and the 2018 Mariah Carey song "A No No", from Caution. Lorber re-recorded the song, this time with vocals by Irene Bauza, as the song "Rain Dance/Wanna Fly" on his 2010 album Now Is the Time.

The song Toad's Place was written during a sound check at the nightclub Toad's Place and performed that night. It has been featured on The Weather Channel's Local On The 8s segments.

Track listing

Personnel 
The Jeff Lorber Fusion
 Jeff Lorber – Fender Rhodes, Yamaha electric grand piano, ARP 2600, Minimoog, Oberheim 4 Voice, Prophet-5
 Danny Wilson – electric bass 
 Dennis Bradford – drums

Guest Musicians
 Jay Koder – jazz guitar, acoustic guitar, guitar solo (7)
 Doug Lewis – "funky" guitar
 Bruce Smith – percussion 
 Dennis Springer – soprano saxophone, tenor saxophone 
 Joe Farrell – flute
 Freddie Hubbard – flugelhorn

Production 
 Jeff Lorber – producer 
 Marlon McClain – associate producer
 Dave Dixon – engineer, mixing
 Jerry Hudgins – engineer, mixing
 John Golden – mastering at Kendun Recorders (Burbank, CA).
 Jeffrey Ross – production coordinator, management 
 Trevor Brown – photography

Charts

References

External links
 Jeff Lorber-Water Sign at Discogs

1979 albums
Jeff Lorber albums
Arista Records albums